Derakht-e Senjed may refer to:
 Derakht-e Senjed, Chenaran
 Derakht-e Senjed, Nishapur
 Derakht-e Senjed, Torbat-e Heydarieh